The 1978 All-Ireland Senior Hurling Championship was the 92nd staging of the All-Ireland hurling championship since its establishment by the Gaelic Athletic Association in 1887. The championship began on 30 April 1978 and ended on 3 September 1978.

Cork entered the championship as defending champions.

On 3 September 1978, Cork won the championship following a 1–15 to 2–8 defeat of Kilkenny in the All-Ireland final. This was their 24th All-Ireland title, their third championship in succession.

Kilkenny's Liam "Chunky" O'Brien was the championship's top scorer with 1-23. Cork's John Horgan was the choice for Hurler of the Year.

Team summaries

Results

Leinster Senior Hurling Championship

First round

Quarter-final

Semi-finals

Final

Munster Senior Hurling Championship

Quarter-finals

Semi-finals

Final

All-Ireland Senior Hurling Championship

Quarter-final

Semi-final

Final

Top scorers

Overall

Single game

Championship statistics

Miscellaneous

 Cork retain the All-Ireland title for a third successive season. It is the fourth time in their history that they have achieved this feat and the first time since Cork in 1954 that a team has won three championships in succession.
 Kerry return to the Munster Senior Hurling Championship for the first time since 1958.

Broadcasting

The following matches were broadcast live on television in Ireland on RTÉ.

Sources

 Corry, Eoghan, The GAA Book of Lists (Hodder Headline Ireland, 2005).
 Donegan, Des, The Complete Handbook of Gaelic Games (DBA Publications Limited, 2005).
 Nolan, Pat, Flashbacks: A Half Century of Cork Hurling (The Collins Press, 2000).

References

All-Ireland Senior Hurling Championship